Lassan Thakral is a village and union council (an administrative subdivision) of Mansehra District in Khyber-Pakhtunkhwa province of Pakistan. It is located in the south of Mansehra district where it borders Abbottabad District.

Demographics
The main and the largest tribe of Lassan Thakral is Tanoli tribe from Ghilji confederation.

References

Union councils of Mansehra District
Populated places in Mansehra District